{{DISPLAYTITLE:C19H20F3N3O3}}
The molecular formula C19H20F3N3O3 (molar mass: 395.38 g/mol, exact mass: 395.1457 u) may refer to:

 Morniflumate
 Orbifloxacin